Tulip Methodist Church is a historic church, with a cemetery, in Claiborne Parish, Louisiana, near Athens.

The church was organized in 1872 when the Pisgah Methodist Church split.  Its building was built in the summer of 1872.

It was added to the National Register of Historic Places in 1987.  It was deemed to be a "superior example" of Greek Revival-styled churches in northwestern Louisiana.

The church building "is styled to resemble a simplified Greek temple". Its front is pedimented, has a full entablature, and has corner pilasters.

In 1983 there were no longer regular church services at the church, but an annual "Tulip Memorial Day" was held and there were occasional other events.

See also
National Register of Historic Places listings in Claiborne Parish, Louisiana

References

Methodist churches in Louisiana
Churches on the National Register of Historic Places in Louisiana
Greek Revival church buildings in Louisiana
Churches completed in 1872
Buildings and structures in Claiborne Parish, Louisiana
National Register of Historic Places in Claiborne Parish, Louisiana